The Heloplacidae are a group of plated aplacophora known from Silurian deposits. Their best understood representative, Acaenoplax, can be taken as representative of the family; it is the only genus for which soft part anatomy is known.

References

Prehistoric mollusc families
Silurian first appearances
Silurian extinctions